Thomas Alfred Williams was an Anglican  priest.

Born on 16 June 1870 and educated at St David's College, Lampeter, he was ordained in  1895. After curacies in Anglesey and Portmadoc he held incumbencies at  Dolgellau and Maentwrog before becoming the Archdeacon of Merioneth in 1931. Nine years later he was appointed Dean of Bangor but died in post after only one year in post on 27 July 1941.

References

Archdeacons of Merioneth
Deans of Bangor
1870 births
1941 deaths
Alumni of the University of Wales, Lampeter